Aphrodite Urania was an epithet of the Greek goddess Aphrodite, signifying "heavenly" or "spiritual", to distinguish her from her more earthly aspect of Aphrodite Pandemos, "Aphrodite for all the people". The two were used (mostly in literature) to differentiate the more "celestial" love of body and soul from purely physical lust. Plato represented her as a daughter of the Greek god Uranus, conceived and born without a mother. According to Hesiod, she was born from the severed genitals of Uranus and emerged from the sea foam.

Urania and Pandemos 
Aphrodite Pandemos was originally an extension of the idea of the goddess Aphrodite to family and city life to include the whole people, the political community. Hence the name was supposed to go back to the time of Theseus, the reputed author of the reorganization of Attica and its demes. Aphrodite Pandemos was held in equal regard with Urania; she was called σεμνή semnē (holy), and was served by priestesses upon whom strict chastity was enjoined. In time, however, the meaning of the term underwent a change, probably due to the philosophers and moralists, by whom a radical distinction was drawn between Aphrodite Urania and Pandemos.

According to Plato, there are two Aphrodites, "the elder, having no mother, who is called the heavenly Aphrodite [Urania] — she is the daughter of Uranus; the younger, who is the daughter of Zeus and Dione — her we call 'common' [Pandemos]." The same distinction is found in Xenophon although the author is doubtful whether there are two goddesses, or whether Urania and Pandemos are two names for the same goddess, just as Zeus, although one and the same, has many titles; but in any case, he says, the ritual of Urania is "purer, more serious", than that of Pandemos.

The same idea is expressed in the statement that after Solon's time courtesans were put under the protection of Aphrodite Pandemos. But there is no doubt that the cult of Aphrodite was on the whole as "pure" as that of any other divinities, and although a distinction may have existed in later times between the goddess of legal marriage and the goddess of free love, the titles Urania and Pandemos do not express that idea.

Etymology and names
According to Herodotus, the Arabs called this aspect of the goddess "Alitta" or "Alilat" ( or ).

The most distinctively Western Asian title of the Greek Aphrodite is Urania, the Semitic "queen of the heavens". It has been explained by reference to the lunar character of the goddess, but more probably signifies "she whose seat is in heaven", whence she exercises her sway over the whole world — earth, sea, and air alike.

Worship
Her cult was first established in Cythera, probably in connection with the purple trade, and at Athens it is associated with the legendary Porphyrion, the purple king. At Thebes, Harmonia (who has been identified as Aphrodite herself) dedicated three statues: of Aphrodite Urania, Pandemos, and Apotrophia.

Wine was not used in the libations offered to her.

Iconography
Aphrodite Urania was represented in Greek art on a swan, a tortoise or a globe.

See also
 Temple of Aphrodite Urania

Footnotes

References

External links

 Aphrodite Ourania of the Bosporus by Yulia Ustinova
  Altar and Sanctuary of Aphrodite Ourania (images)

Epithets of Aphrodite